Kavyli is a village in the northern part of the Evros regional unit in Greece. It is part of the municipal unit of Vyssa, which is part of the municipality Orestiada since 2011. In 2011 its population was 758. It is bypassed by the Greek National Road 51 (Feres - Soufli - Orestiada - Ormenio). It is 7 km north of the centre of Orestiada, and 4 km southwest of Nea Vyssa.

Population

The town is populated by Arvanites.

History

The village was founded by the Ottoman Turks, it was known as Emirler (Емирлер in Bulgarian). After a brief period of Bulgarian rule between 1913 and 1919, it became part of Greece. As a result its Bulgarian and Turkish population was exchanged with Greek refugees, mainly from today's Turkey. Kavyli joined the municipality of Vyssa in the late 1990s.

See also
List of settlements in the Evros regional unit

External links
Kavyli on GTP Travel Pages

References

Populated places in Evros (regional unit)
Albanian communities of Western Thrace